Kent Island is an island situated in the Chesapeake Bay in the U.S. state of Maryland.

Kent Island may also refer to:

Islands
Kent Island (California) in Marin County
Kent Island, New Brunswick, in Canada
Kent Island (Queensland), in Australia
Kent Island (Chile), in Aysén Region

Other uses
Kent Island Research Facility, a U.S. National Security Agency facility in Maryland
Ships named USS Kent Island, including:
USS Kent Island (AG-78), a liberty ship
USS Kent Island (AKS-26), a liberty ship

See also
Kent (disambiguation)